Victor Cito Borge (born 18 December 1965 in Grünerløkka, Oslo, Norway) is a bassist best known for playing in the Norwegian hard rock band TNT. He joined TNT in 2005, replacing Sid Ringsby, and played on three studio albums and one live album. Borge left TNT in December 2012 to pursue another project, but rejoined in late 2013.

Borge started playing the bass when he was 8 years old. He has also played in the black metal bands Khold and Tulus, and the rock bands Jack in the Box and Autopulver, both of which included former TNT drummer Frode Lamøy.

Discography

TNT
 Live in Madrid - CD + DVD package (2006)
 The New Territory (2007)
 Atlantis (2008)
 A Farewell to Arms (2010)

References

Sources
http://www.tnttheband.com/victor.html

1965 births
Norwegian heavy metal bass guitarists
Norwegian male bass guitarists
TNT (Norwegian band) members
Living people
Norwegian black metal musicians